Linnuraba Nature Reserve is a nature reserve situated in Estonia, in Rapla County.

It is a representative example in Estonia of floodplain grasslands.

References

Nature reserves in Estonia
Märjamaa Parish
Rapla Parish
Kohila Parish
Saue Parish